USS Donald Cook (DDG-75) is an  guided missile destroyer in the United States Navy named for Medal of Honor recipient Donald Cook, a Colonel in the United States Marine Corps. This ship is the 25th destroyer of her class and the 14th of the class to be built at Bath Iron Works in Bath, Maine. Construction began on 9 July 1996, she was launched and christened on 3 May 1997, and on 4 December 1998 she was commissioned at Penn's Landing Pier in Philadelphia, Pennsylvania.

On 16 February 2012, Secretary of the Navy Ray Mabus announced Donald Cook will be one of four ships to be homeported at Naval Station Rota, Spain. It was announced in January 2014 that the ship would arrive there in mid-February 2014. In Rota she forms part of Destroyer Squadron 60.

Upgrade 
On 12 November 2009, the Missile Defense Agency announced that Donald Cook would be upgraded during fiscal 2012 to RIM-161 Standard Missile 3 (SM-3) capability in order to function as part of the Aegis Ballistic Missile Defense System.

In 2016, four destroyers patrolling with the U.S. 6th Fleet based in Naval Station Rota, Spain, including Donald Cook received self-protection upgrades, replacing the aft Phalanx CIWS 20mm Vulcan cannon with the SeaRAM 11-cell RIM-116 Rolling Airframe Missile launcher. The SeaRam uses the same sensor dome as the Phalanx. This was the first time the close-range ship defense system was paired with an Aegis ship. All four ships to receive the upgrade were either Flight I or II, meaning they originally had two Phalanx CIWS systems when launched.

Service history

2010s

On 24 February 2012, Donald Cook was awarded the 2011 Battle Efficiency "E" award. On 9 April 2014, U.S. military officials confirmed the deployment of Donald Cook to the Black Sea, shortly after Russia's annexation of Crimea and amid the pro-Russian unrest in Ukraine. The U.S. Department of Defense's official statement said that the vessel's mission was "to reassure NATO allies and Black Sea partners of America’s commitment to strengthen and improve interoperability while working towards mutual goals in the region". On 10 April 2014, the warship was reported to have entered the Black Sea. On 12 April 2014, an unarmed Russian Su-24 "Fencer" strike aircraft made twelve close-range passes of Donald Cook during a patrol of the western Black Sea. According to an allegation by a Pentagon spokesman, "The aircraft did not respond to multiple queries and warnings from Donald Cook, and the event ended without incident after approximately 90 minutes." It was further stated that  Donald Cook is more than capable of defending herself against a pair of Su-24s. In 2014, Russia's state-run news media outlets ran a series of reports that falsely asserted that during that incident the Su-24, equipped with the Khibiny electronic warfare system, had disabled the ship's Aegis combat systems. The misinformation was later picked up by the British tabloid The Sun and by Fox News, and later reported as Russian propaganda by The New York Times.

On 14 April 2014, Donald Cook visited Constanta, Romania, where President Traian Băsescu, had a tour of the ship. Donald Cook then conducted various exercises in concert with the Romanian Navy before departing the Black Sea on 24 April 2014. On 26 December 2014, for the second time, according to the U.S. Navy, the destroyer entered the Black Sea in order to reassure and demonstrate U.S. commitment to work closely with NATO allies. Donald Cook participated in exercises with the Turkish Navy including an underway replenishment and other exercises with the  TCG Fatih on 28 December 2014. The ship visited Constanta, Romania on 30 December and Varna, Bulgaria on 8 January 2015. Donald Cook participated in exercises with Ukrainian Navy ship  on 11 January 2015. Donald Cook departed the Black Sea on 14 January 2015.

A Russian Ka-27 "Helix" anti-submarine helicopter also circled the destroyer seven times. The U.S. Navy released photos and videos of the incident on 14 April, and the U.S. government lodged a complaint with the Russian government. In response to the U.S. Secretary of State commenting on the incident and saying that "under the rules of engagement, that could have been a shoot-down", the Russian Federation Council's official Igor Morozov said that the U.S. likewise "ought to know that Donald Cook approached our borders and may already be unable to depart those." On 26 February 2019, the ship hosted U.S. diplomats Gordon Sondland, Marie Yovanovitch, Kurt Volker, EU's Jean Christophe-Belliard and Ukrainian President Petro Poroshenko, among others.

2020s
On 23 February 2020, the ship entered the Black Sea, marking the seventh time a U.S. ship had entered the sea in 2020. While in the Black Sea, the ship conducted routine maritime security operations.  departed Naval Station Norfolk on 26 March, to replace Donald Cook as one of the forward destroyers located Rota, Spain.  Donald Cook's new homeport will be Naval Station Mayport.

On 25 April 2022, the ship returned to Mayport after a three-month deployment.

Coat of arms

Shield 
The shield has background of dark blue with a light blue trim. A reversed star hangs above a gauntlet hoisting a broken chain and crossing sword. Missiles surround the shield.The traditional Navy colors were chosen for the shield because dark blue and gold represents the sea and excellence respectively. Red is also included to signify valor and sacrifice. The armoured gauntlet holding a broken chain represents Colonel Cook's gallantry and indomitable spirit in captivity as a prisoner of war to the Viet Cong. He put the interests of his comrades before his own life. The crossed swords denote spirit and teamwork as well as U.S. Navy and Marine Corps heritage. The U.S. Marine Corps officers' Mameluke sword is representative of Colonel Cook's Marine service. The light blue upside-down star symbolizes the Medal of Honor Cook earned for his spirit, sacrifice, and heroism.

Crest 
The crest consists of an eagle surrounded by red tridents.The eagle is symbolic to the principles of freedom which our country was founded, highlighting military vigilance and national defense. The trident represents sea power and her AEGIS firepower which brings the capability of conducting operations in multi threat environments.

Motto 
The motto is written on a scroll of gold that has a red reverse side.The ships motto is "Faith without Fear". The motto is a reference to both the honorable feats of Colonel Cook and the Medal of Honor he received.

Seal 
The coat of arms in full color as in the blazon, upon a white background enclosed within a dark blue oval border edged on the outside with a gold rope and bearing the inscription "USS DONALD COOK" at the top and "DDG 75" in the base all gold.

References

Further reading 
 (Describes the construction of Donald Cook at Bath Iron Works.)

External links 

 "USS Donald Cook Official Web-Site" 
 USS Donald Cook Command History Reports
 USS Donald Cook webpage
 

 

Arleigh Burke-class destroyers
Destroyers of the United States
Ships built in Bath, Maine
1997 ships